Dan Deublein (born November 22, 1972 in Show Low, Arizona) is an American actor who retired from the entertainment industry in 2005.

Acting career 
Dan Deublein is best known for his role as Ben Swift on Beverly Hills, 90210 and as the thieving Scott Majors on ABC's daytime soap Port Charles. Having graduated from Arizona State University, he worked locally in Phoenix as both an actor and model for the Ruth Leighton Agency. Deublein also worked commercially on campaigns including Cobra Golf Clubs, Bud Light, Ford Splash and Pontiac.

In 2018, he purchased a vacation home in Greer, Arizona while shooting the short film "Rooted in Arizona". It was accepted into the Austin Film Festival, NatureTrack Film Festival and won Best Documentary Short at the Independent Shorts Awards in Los Angeles, California.

Film & television 
Deublein has played roles in numerous television shows including Beverly Hills, 90210, General Hospital, Port Charles, JAG, Arrest & Trial and The West Wing. He also appeared with Leonard Nimoy and Christopher De Lancie in the live radio production of The Lost World. In 2020, he was asked to shoot a short film for the outdoor company MoonShade which is set to air on November 17, 2021.

Personal life 
Dan Deublein married red carpet reporter Lauree Vignovich in 2006. After leaving the entertainment industry, he went on to study at Des Moines University Osteopathic School of Medicine. He would later serve as CEO of a healthcare solutions company which was acquired in 2012. He and his wife reside in Arizona and are currently retired.

References 

IMDB 2021 https://www.imdb.com/name/nm0221994/

External links 

1972 births
Living people
Arizona State University alumni
People from Navajo County, Arizona
Male actors from Arizona